Sherwood Harry Egbert (July 24, 1920 – 1969) was an American businessman and marine. He served as president of the Studebaker-Packard Corporation and Studebaker Corporation from February 1, 1961 to November 24, 1963.

History
Egbert was born July 24, 1920 in Easton, Kittitas County, Washington.

He studied engineering at Washington State University for two years.

In 1942, he joined the United States Marine Corps and became a major. He served in the South Pacific.

He joined Studebaker from the McCulloch Motors Corporation, with no experience of the automobile industry.

He replaced former president Harold E. Churchill under a corporate goal of diversification—to get the company out of carmaking and "absorb Studebaker's tax loss credits ($94 million) by merging with prosperous companies". Instead, Egbert took a genuine interest in the cars and moved his home to the Studebaker proving grounds lodge. He set out to resurrect the auto division's flagging fortunes, encouraged by industry reports of projected sales figures that indicated that there would still be room for a smaller manufacturer.

He initiated production of the stylish Avanti, based on a Lark chassis and drivetrain with fiberglass bodywork designed by a team headed by Raymond Loewy. The car was in production by the spring of 1962, insufficient lead time for comprehensive assembly and distribution of the many orders soon received. He had hoped to sell 20,000 Avantis that year but could only build 1200. To revamp the Studebaker passenger cars, Egbert hired Brooks Stevens "on a minuscule budget", with good results such as the Gran Turismo Hawk; overall sales continued to be well below the break-even point.

Disagreements between Egbert and Studebaker's board of directors exacerbated the illness with which he was diagnosed in 1962. Cancer surgeries and lengthy recuperation absence allowed the board to ease him out of office, replacing him as president with Byers A. Burlingame. He resigned on November 24, 1963. Studebaker closed its U.S. auto manufacturing operations just a month later. Production was moved to the Canadian plant where Studebaker continued building cars until March 1966.

In 1964 Egbert established a management consulting firm in Los Angeles.

Egbert died in Los Angeles in 1969.

See also
Excalibur (automobile)

Footnotes

Further reading
The Unlikely Studebaker: Raymond Loewy and the Birth (and Rebirth) of the Avanti at 'Ate up with Motor'
Excerpt on appointment and on management style from Car Classics, February 1974 pp 68–69

1920 births
1969 deaths
People in the automobile industry
Studebaker people
United States Marine Corps officers
Washington State University alumni
United States Marine Corps personnel of World War II